Donut King is an Australian-based multinational doughnut company, as well as a quick service restaurant. It specialises in classic Australian-style Doughnuts and coffee. Its signatures are hot cinnamon donuts and the classics, and it also offers Quakeshakes, Thickshakes and Milkshakes, and barista-made DK Coffee Blend.

History
The Donut King chain was founded in 1981 in Sydney. The Donut King Brand System was established in Australia in 1989 and has been operating as a franchise system since 1991. It is currently managed, under licence, by the Gold Coast-based Retail Food Group Limited. Retail Food Group also manages Gloria Jeans Coffee, Michel's Patisserie, Brumby's Bakeries,  Crust Pizza, and bb's Café, with a total of 1050 stores within Australia and New Zealand.

As of January 2020, there were over 250 Donut King stores in Australia and a number of stores internationally across New Zealand, Fiji, Saudi Arabia, Papua New Guinea, China and the United Kingdom. In July 2008, Donut King entered into a master licence agreement with Shanghai-based Mak Brands, marking the Australian brand's first foray into the China market. There are now 14 stores in China.

Donut King is not related to a restaurant with the same name that is located in St. Charles, Missouri, United States, or several other Donut King located across the United States.

World's Largest Doughnut
On 5 December 2007, Donut King oversaw construction of the World's Largest Doughnut, in order to celebrate The Simpsons Movie's DVD release. It was created from over 90,000 doughnuts, using half a tonne of pink icing and 30 kg of sprinkles from Donut King. Taking 40 people over nine hours to build, the giant doughnut measured six metres and weighed 3.5 tonnes.

See also
 List of doughnut shops
 List of restaurant chains in Australia

References

Australian brands
Doughnut shops
Fast-food chains of Australia
Fast-food franchises
Companies based on the Gold Coast, Queensland
Restaurants established in 1981
1981 establishments in Australia